Charles Bohris Ferster (1 November 1922 – 3 February 1981) was an American behavioral psychologist. A pioneer of applied behavior analysis, he developed errorless learning and was a colleague of B.F. Skinner's at Harvard University, co-authoring the book Schedules of Reinforcement (1957).

Career
Ferster received his bachelor's degree at Rutgers University in 1947 followed by his Master's in 1948 and Ph.D. in 1958 from Columbia University. He then worked as a colleague with B. F. Skinner at Harvard University, where they established the Journal of the Experimental Analysis of Behavior in 1958. While at Harvard, he devised errorless learning to train animals, and used other forms of what was then termed behavior modification for clients with depression and obesity. While serving as an assistant professor of psychology at Indiana University School of Medicine from 1957 to 1962, Ferster employed errorless learning to instruct young autistic children how to speak.

Ferster's research also influenced the work of other pioneers of behavioral research, such as Donald M. Baer and Sidney Bijou, who together founded the Journal of Applied Behavior Analysis at the University of Kansas. Another well-known researcher was Ivar Lovaas, who applied Ferster's procedures to autistic children at the University of California, Los Angeles (UCLA) and developed early intensive behavioral intervention (EIBI), or 6.5 hours per day of what he called, "discrete trial training" (DTT).

Early childhood and family life
Ferster was born November 1, 1922, in Freehold, New Jersey, the second son of Julius Ferster (1894-1969) and Mollie Ferster nee Madwin (1895-1966), both Jewish immigrants from Poland (The Russian Empire, 1910 and 1912, respectively).

He was married to Marilyn Ferster, with whom he had four children—Bill, Andrea, Sam and Warren. He later married Elyce Zenoff Ferster, a professor of law at George Washington University,

Ferster died of a heart attack on February 3, 1981, at the age of 58 in Washington, D.C.

Timeline
Education
1940–1943 Rutgers University (New Brunswick, NJ)
1943–1946 Military Service
1946–1947 Rutgers University (New Brunswick, NJ) (B.S, 1947)
1947–1950 Columbia University (New York, NY) (M.A., 1948; Ph.D, 1950)

Post-doctoral professional affiliations
1950–1955 Harvard University (Cambridge, MA) Research Fellow under B.F. Skinner
1955–1957 Yerkes Laboratory (Atlanta, GA at Emory University)(Chimpanzee work)
1957–1962 Indiana University Medical Center (Indianapolis, IN) (work with autistic children; collaboration with Nurnberger & Brady)
1958 - First Executive Editor, Journal of the Experimental Analysis of Behavior (JEAB); See Founding of the Journal of the Experimental Analysis of Behavior 
1962–1963 Executive Director, Institute for Behavioral Research (Silver Spring, MD)
1963–1965 Associate Director, Institute for Behavioral Research (Silver Spring, MD)
1965–1968 Senior Research Associate, Institute for Behavioral Research (Silver Spring, MD)
1967–1968 Professor of Psychology, Georgetown University (Washington, DC)
1969–1981 Professor of Psychology, American University (Washington, DC) (Department Chair, 1970–1973)

Professional life
Journal of the Experimental Analysis of Behavior

Laboratory work

Application of the theory
 Linwood Project
 Individualized Instruction at Georgetown, American Universities
 The University Learning Center at American University: this represented a radical experiment in undergraduate, interdisciplinary education in which the principles of operant behavior were directly applied. The center itself—an open, free-flowing physical space on campus—was conceived of as the "chamber" in which instruction and learning occurred. The environment adhered in obvious ways to such cornerstone concepts as immediate positive reinforcement, successive approximation, schedules of reinforcement, discriminative stimuli and the like. Professors of Psychology, Physics, Anthropology, Psychiatry, Sociology, Philosophy, Mathematics staffed the Learning Center, as did many graduate students in these fields.

Social and professional network
Following is a partial list of professional colleagues and friends of Charles Ferster; those interested in behaviorism, operant conditioning, and human behavior more generally may be interested in these people and their work:

Margaret J. Rioch, David McK. Rioch, John L. Cameron, James Dinsmoor,
Douglas G. Anger, James E. Anliker, Donald S. Blough, Richard J. Herrnstein, Alfredo V. Lagmay, William H. Morse, Nathan H. Azrin, Ogden R. Lindsley, Lewis R. Gollub, Matthew L. Israel, Harlan L. Lane, George S. Reynolds, A. Charles Catania, Herbert S. Terrace, Neil J. Peterson. William N. Schoenfeld

Written works
Books
Schedules of Reinforcement, with B.F. Skinner, 1957  .
An Introduction to the Science of Human Behavior, with Nurnberger, J. I. & Brady, J. P., 1963
Behavior Principles, with Mary Carol Perott, 1968; (Second Edition 1981, with Stuart A. Culbertson)
 
Articles
Arbitrary and Natural Reinforcement 1967, The Psychological Record, 22, 1-16
An Experimental Analysis of Clinical Phenomena 1972, The Psychological Record, 22, 1-16 [citation incorrect]
Clinical Reinforcement 1972, Seminars in Psychiatry, 4(2), 110-111
A Laboratory Model of Psychotherapy 1979, In P. Sjoden (Ed), Trends in Behavior Therapy. New York, Academic Press
Psychotherapy from the standpoint of a behaviorist, 1972, In J.D. Keehn (Ed.), Psychopathology in Animals: research and clinical implications. New York, Academic Press
The Autistic Child
Positive Reinforcement and Behavioral Deficits of Autistic Children, Child Development 1961, 32:437-456
The use of the free operant in the analysis of behavior, 1953 Psychological Bulletin, 50, 263-274.
The Development of Performances in Autistic Children in an Automatically Controlled Environment, Charles B. Ferster, Marian K. DeMyer, Journal of Chronic Diseases 1961 Apr; 13:312-4
A functional analysis of depression, American Psychologist 1973, 857-870.
 The control of eating, In J. P. Foreyt (Ed.), Behavioral treatments of obesity (pp. 309–326). Oxford: Pergamon Press. Ferster, C. B., Nurnberger, J. I. & Levitt, E. E. (1977).

References
Fred S. Keller, Charles Bohris Ferster (1922–1981), An Appreciation, Journal of the Experimental Analysis of Behavior 1981, 36, 299-301
B.F. Skinner, Charles B. Ferster—A personal memoir, Journal of the Experimental Analysis of Behavior 1981, 35, 259-261

Citations

External links
Article by B.F. Skinner
P.B. Dews on Behavioral Pharmacology and C.B. Ferster
JEAB's First Editorial Board

1922 births
1981 deaths
20th-century American psychologists
Behaviourist psychologists
Educational psychologists
Rutgers University alumni
Columbia University alumni
People from Monmouth County, New Jersey
Harvard Fellows
Georgetown University faculty